Christian Collett Hersleb Kjerschow (23 August 1821 – 10 April 1889) was a Norwegian politician.

He was born in Aker as the oldest son of bishop Peder Christian Hersleb Kjerschow (1786–1866) and his wife Johanne Benedicte Collett (1802–1851). His younger sister Caroline Sophie Erasmine Kjerschow married businessman Jacob Andreas Michelsen, and was the mother of Christian Michelsen. Christian Kjerschow was also a maternal grandson of mining director Christian Ancher Collett.

Christian Collett Kjerschow married Nancy Adelaide Esbensen. They had several children. In the 1902 census his family were registered with two servants. Their sons Peder and Karald and grandson Arild all became jurists.

Christian Collett Kjerschow was elected from the constituency Tromsø, Hammerfest, Vardø og Vadsø to the Norwegian Parliament in 1868. At that time he served as stipendiary magistrate (byfoged) and chief of police. He then served as County Governor of Tromsøe Amt from 1869 to 1889.

References

1821 births
1889 deaths
Members of the Storting
Politicians from Tromsø
County governors of Norway